Edward "Chuck" Williams (born June 6, 1946) is a retired American basketball player who competed in both the National Basketball Association (NBA) and the rival American Basketball Association (ABA).  A 6' 2" (1.88 m) guard from the University of Colorado, he played eight professional seasons (1970–1978), spending time with multiple teams including the Pittsburgh Condors (ABA), the Denver Nuggets (ABA, then NBA), the San Diego Conquistadors (ABA), the Kentucky Colonels (ABA), the Memphis Sounds (ABA), the Baltimore Claws (ABA), the Virginia Squires (ABA) and the Buffalo Braves (NBA).

Williams's finest season occurred in 1972–73, when he averaged 17.7 points and 7.7 assists for the Conquistadors. He retired in 1978 with career totals of 6,849 points and 2,869 assists. He holds the record for most games played in a single season, registering 90 games (57 for San Diego and 33 for Kentucky) during the 1973–74 ABA season.

External links
Career Stats

1946 births
Living people
African-American basketball players
American men's basketball players
Basketball players from Colorado
Buffalo Braves players
Colorado Buffaloes men's basketball players
Denver Nuggets players
Kentucky Colonels players
Memphis Sounds players
Philadelphia 76ers draft picks
Pittsburgh Condors players
Point guards
San Diego Conquistadors players
Sportspeople from Boulder, Colorado
Virginia Squires players
21st-century African-American people
20th-century African-American sportspeople